Johnny de Lima (born 21 July 1964) is a Danish boxer. He competed in the men's light middleweight event at the 1988 Summer Olympics.

References

External links
 

1964 births
Living people
Danish male boxers
Olympic boxers of Denmark
Boxers at the 1988 Summer Olympics
People from Randers Municipality
Light-middleweight boxers
Sportspeople from the Central Denmark Region